Peter O'Leary may refer to:
Peter O'Leary (referee) (born 1972), New Zealand association football referee
Peter O'Leary (Kerry Gaelic footballer), Gaelic football goalkeeper from County Kerry
Peter O'Leary (Laois Gaelic footballer) (born 1985), Gaelic football player from Laois in Ireland
Peter O'Leary (sailor) (born 1983), Irish sailor
Peadar Ua Laoghaire (1839–1920), Irish-language author